is a two-on-two fighting arcade game released by Namco in 1992. It runs on Namco NA-2 hardware, and represents the company's answer to Capcom's 1991 hit Street Fighter II.

Gameplay
In the single-player tournament mode, the player's chosen character fights an opponent in best two-out-of-three matches with the CPU or against another human player; however, when both are knocked out simultaneously in the first round, one of them will win the second round. The player has a character roster of six fighters to choose from, each with their own weapons and special techniques. After the player knocks out five different characters, the player must fight two opponents at once instead of one, for three rounds, and finally an "evil" solid-gold version of their own character, before their character's own ending sequence. The most notable features are the jump button, and multiplayer mode which allows up to four players to play simultaneously; however, the multiplayer mode does not have an ending (much like Cosmo Gang: The Puzzle, which was released earlier in 1992 and also ran on Namco's NA-1 hardware), and the closest a player can get to winning it is if they win ninety-nine times because that is when their "WIN" counter will roll over.

Characters
There are six playable characters and no bosses; all of them have their own unique statistics and special moves.
  (voice actor: Nobuo Tobita): Born in Honolulu, 1964, measuring 181 cm (5'11") high, and weighing 84 kg (185 lb); he uses dual tonfas, and has the catchphrase of "I am No. 1!" when he wins.
  (voice actor: Toshiyuki Morikawa): From the game home country, he was born in Kyoto in 1967, measures 175 cm (5'9") high, and weighs 75 kg (165 lb); he uses a kusarigama, and has a catchphrase of  when he wins. His ending reveals himself to be an undercover investigator of the ICPO.
 : he was born in Athens in 1957, measures 158 cm (5'2") high, and weighs 70 kg (154 lb); he uses a hammer, and a catchphrase "Gyahahahaha!".
  (voice actor: Megumi Hayashibara): Born Hong Kong in 1974, she measures 168 cm (5'6") and weighs 43 kg (95 lb); she uses a quarterstaff, and has the catchphrase "Yeah!" on a win.
  (voice actor: Nobuo Tobita, same as Vincent): Born in Lillehammer, 1953, he measures 216 cm (8'4") high, and weighs 127 kg (280 lb); he uses dual axes and a catchphrase "Hahahaha!".
  (voice actor: Kotono Mitsuishi): Was born in Sao Paulo in 1969 and measures 172 cm (5'8") high, but her weight is unknown; she uses steel claws, and a catchphrase "Come On Baby!"

Virtual Console release
The game was later re-released by Namco Bandai Games (as they are now known) on the Virtual Console in Japan on August 18, 2009.

Reception 
In Japan, Game Machine listed Knuckle Heads on their April 15, 1993 issue as being the seventh most-successful table arcade game of the year. RePlay reported Knuckle Heads to be the nineteenth most-popular arcade game at the time.

See also
List of fighting games

References

External links

Knuckle Heads at arcade-history
Knuckle Heads at Fight-A-Base
Knuckle Heads at Fighters Front Line
Knuckle Heads at The Large Cult Fighting Game March 

1992 video games
Arcade video games
Cooperative video games
Fighting games
Multiplayer and single-player video games
Namco arcade games
Video games developed in Japan
Virtual Console games